Eleanor Jean Greenwood is an Australian soprano best known as an opera singer. She is a graduate of the Royal Academy of Music Opera Studio in London, England.

Career
Her debut with Wexford Festival Opera was as Pachole in Maria Polish Opera by Roman Statkowski. She was a mezzo soprano and has performed roles including Hänsel in Hänsel und Gretel, Rosina in Il barbiere di Siviglia, Count Orlofsky in Die Fledermaus, La Ciesca in Gianni Schicchi, Endimione in La Calisto, The Wife in Paradise Moscow (Cheryomushki), L'Enfant in L'Enfant et les Sortileges and Zerlina in Don Giovanni. She has performed roles in The Cunning Little Vixen by Janáček. She is the sister of Australian musicologist Andrew Greenwood.

References

External links
Eleanor Greenwood

Living people
21st-century Australian women opera singers
Operatic mezzo-sopranos
Year of birth missing (living people)